A constitutional referendum was held in Togo on 5 May 1963 alongside the general elections. The changes to the constitution would make the country a presidential republic with a unicameral National Assembly. It was approved by 98.5% of voters with a 91.1% turnout.

Results

References

1963 referendums
1963 in Togo
1963
Constitutional referendums
May 1963 events in Africa